Adrian Whitehead (born 25 August 1975) is a former Australian rules footballer who played for Carlton. A defender, he was the youngest member of the club's premiership winning side of 1995, playing in every game.

Whitehead, originally from Federal in the Upper Murray Football League, he won the 1992 Ovens & Murray Football League Rookie of the Year award, while playing for Wodonga. 

Whitehead started to suffer from a foot injury during the 1996 pre-season. It flared up against Geelong late in 1997 and he was forced off the ground injured. He had damaged the nerves and tendons in his foot and did not play in the 1998 AFL season. Whitehead's last game came in round 13 the following season and he was delisted afterwards, going on to coach the Wodonga Raiders.

In 2001, Whitehead sued Carlton Football Club for damages from a pain-killing injection their doctor gave him in a game in the 1997 season. It was alleged that the injection made him unable to protect his foot during the game which resulted in ruptured tendons, nerve damage and bone fractures. The case went to the Supreme Court and in 2005 a verdict was handed down. It was decided that although Whitehead was entitled to compensation he was not owed any from Carlton. Whitehead was advised to seek a settlement through the Workers Compensation Act.

Statistics

|-
|- style="background-color: #EAEAEA"
! scope="row" style="text-align:center" | 1994
|style="text-align:center;"|
| 32 || 8 || 0 || 3 || 30 || 31 || 61 || 8 || 3 || 0.0 || 0.4 || 3.8 || 3.9 || 7.6 || 1.0 || 0.4
|-
|style="text-align:center;background:#afe6ba;"|1995†
|style="text-align:center;"|
| 32 || 25 || 4 || 8 || 177 || 128 || 305 || 42 || 25 || 0.2 || 0.3 || 7.1 || 5.1 || 12.2 || 1.7 || 1.0
|- style="background-color: #EAEAEA"
! scope="row" style="text-align:center" | 1996
|style="text-align:center;"|
| 32 || 16 || 6 || 6 || 96 || 104 || 200 || 31 || 13 || 0.4 || 0.4 || 6.0 || 6.5 || 12.5 || 1.9 || 0.8
|-
! scope="row" style="text-align:center" | 1997
|style="text-align:center;"|
| 32 || 13 || 12 || 11 || 106 || 79 || 185 || 38 || 12 || 0.9 || 0.8 || 8.2 || 6.1 || 14.2 || 2.9 || 0.9
|- style="background-color: #EAEAEA"
! scope="row" style="text-align:center" | 1998
|style="text-align:center;"|
| 32 || 0 || — || — || — || — || — || — || — || — || — || — || — || — || — || —
|-
! scope="row" style="text-align:center" | 1999
|style="text-align:center;"|
| 32 || 1 || 0 || 0 || 1 || 6 || 7 || 0 || 1 || 0.0 || 0.0 || 1.0 || 6.0 || 7.0 || 0.0 || 1.0
|- class="sortbottom"
! colspan=3| Career
! 63
! 22
! 28
! 410
! 348
! 758
! 119
! 54
! 0.3
! 0.4
! 6.5
! 5.5
! 12.0
! 1.9
! 0.9
|}

References

External links
 Blueseum Profile

1975 births
Living people
Australian rules footballers from Victoria (Australia)
Carlton Football Club players
Carlton Football Club Premiership players
Wodonga Football Club players
One-time VFL/AFL Premiership players